Goulburn is a city in New South Wales, Australia. 

Goulburn may refer also refer to:

Australia
 Goulburn Airport, New South Wales
 Goulburn River, Victoria
 Goulburn River (New South Wales)
 Goulburn Street, Sydney
 Goulburn Street, Hobart, Tasmania
 Goulburn Valley, Victoria
 Electoral district of Goulburn, New South Wales
 Electoral district of Goulburn (Victoria)
 Parish of Goulburn, New South Wales
 Shire of Goulburn, Victoria
 Goulburn railway station

Other uses
 Goulburn (Mars)
 Goulburn (surname)
 , a 1940 Bathurst-class corvette

See also
 
 Goulburn Watsford (1859–1951), Australian cricketer